"Don't She Look Good" is a song written by Jerry Chesnut that was recorded by American country singer-songwriter Bill Anderson. It was released as a single in 1972 via Decca Records and became a major hit the same year.

Background and release
"Don't She Look Good" was recorded on June 29, 1972, at the Bradley Studio, located in Nashville, Tennessee. The sessions were produced by Owen Bradley, who would serve as Anderson's producer through most of years with Decca Records. Two additional tracks were recorded at the same session: "Watching It" and "I
m Just Gone."

"Don't She Look Good" was released as a single by Decca Records in August 1972. The song spent 16 weeks on the Billboard Hot Country Singles before reaching number two in May 1972. In Canada, the single reached number two on the RPM Country Songs chart. It was released on his 1972 LP of the same name, Don't She Look Good.

Track listings
7" vinyl single
 "Don't She Look Good" – 2:07
 "I'm Just Gone" – 2:35

Chart performance

References

1972 singles
1972 songs
Bill Anderson (singer) songs
Decca Records singles
Song recordings produced by Owen Bradley
Songs written by Jerry Chesnut